Jacob Anthony Phillip Smith (born 3 April 1991) is a New Zealand field hockey player.

Personal life
Smith was born and raised in Wellington, New Zealand.

Career

Club level
In the New Zealand National Hockey League Smith plays for Auckland. During the 2018–19 season, Smith relocated to the Netherlands to play in the Dutch Hoofdklasse for Pinoké.

National team
Smith made his national debut for the Black Sticks in 2012. Shortly after, he represented the team at his first major tournament, the Champions Trophy.

In 2014, Smith medalled for the first time with New Zealand at the 2012–13 FIH World League in New Delhi, India, where the team lost 2–7 to the Netherlands in the final.

Smith's most recent appearance for the team was during the inaugural tournament of the FIH Pro League in 2019. New Zealand finished in eighth and last place in the competition. He has also been named in the Black Sticks team for the 2019 Ready Steady Tokyo Olympic test event in Tokyo, Japan.

International goals

References

External links
 
 
 
 
 

1991 births
Living people
New Zealand male field hockey players
Male field hockey forwards
Field hockey players at the 2020 Summer Olympics
Olympic field hockey players of New Zealand
Field hockey players at the 2022 Commonwealth Games
Field hockey players from Wellington City
2023 Men's FIH Hockey World Cup players
20th-century New Zealand people
21st-century New Zealand people